Alan Pérez may refer to:

 Alan Pérez (cyclist) (born 1982), Spanish road bicycle racer
 Alan Pérez (footballer) (born 1991), Argentine centre-back